The International Journal of Fertility is an academic journal devoted to the medical and biological aspects of reproduction.

References

Family medicine journals
Publications established in 1955
Obstetrics and gynaecology journals